Glumicalyx is a genus of flowering plants belonging to the family Scrophulariaceae.

Its native range is Southern Africa.

Species:

Glumicalyx apiculatus 
Glumicalyx flanaganii 
Glumicalyx goseloides 
Glumicalyx lesuticus 
Glumicalyx montanus 
Glumicalyx nutans

References

Scrophulariaceae
Scrophulariaceae genera